Gwillimsville was a settlement at the head of Cherry Creek and six miles east of Monument in northern El Paso County, Colorado. Its settlers were engaged in dairy, ranching, and timber businesses. It had a rural post office from 1878 to 1890.

See also
 List of ghost towns in Colorado

References

Former populated places in El Paso County, Colorado
Former populated places in Colorado